Moustapha Diallo (born 16 May 1992) is a Guinean footballer who plays as a forward for Italian club USG Carotenuto.

Career

Italy
Diallo arrived to Italy in the summer 2014. He had some problems with his residence permit and therefore, ended up joining ASD Cicciano Calcio, where he scored 33 goals in 15 games.

In July 2018, Diallo joined Italian club Afro Napoli United. However, on 1 December 2018, the club announced that Diallo had left the club again. On 12 August 2019, Diallo joined USG Carotenuto.

References

External links
 
 
 Player profile at HLSZ 
 

1992 births
Living people
Guinean emigrants to Italy
Sportspeople from Conakry
Guinean footballers
Association football forwards
Budapest Honvéd FC II players
Kaposvári Rákóczi FC players
A.P.S. Zakynthos players
S.F. Aversa Normanna players
Nemzeti Bajnokság I players
Nemzeti Bajnokság II players
Football League (Greece) players
Serie D players
Guinean expatriate footballers
Expatriate footballers in Hungary
Expatriate footballers in Greece
Expatriate footballers in Italy
Guinean expatriate sportspeople in Hungary
Guinean expatriate sportspeople in Greece
Guinean expatriate sportspeople in Italy